Klajdi is an Albanian masculine given name and may refer to:
Klajdi Broshka (born 1993), Albanian footballer
Klajdi Kuka (born 1990), Albanian footballer
Klajdi Toska (born 1994), Albanian footballer

Albanian masculine given names